The 1997 Riley Superstar International was a professional non-ranking snooker tournament that took place between 14 and 16 August 1997 at the Guangdong Hotel, Guangzhou, China.

Ronnie O'Sullivan won in the final 5–3 against Jimmy White.

First group stage

Group 1

 Ken Doherty 2–0 Keith Boon
 Guo Hua 2–0 Keith Boon
 Ken Doherty 2–0 Guo Hua

Group 2

 James Wattana 2–1 Hasimu Tuerxun
 Hasimu Tuerxun 2–0 Gao Feng
 Gao Feng 2–1 James Wattana

Group 3

 Jimmy White 2–1 Xu Xinjian
 Xu Xinjian 2–1 Li Jin
 Jimmy White 2–0 Li Jin

Group 4

 Pang Weiguo 2–0 Ronnie O'Sullivan
 Pang Weiguo 2–0 Li Zong
 Ronnie O'Sullivan 2–0 Li Zong

Second group stage

Group 1

 Ken Doherty 3–0 Hasimu Tuerxun
 James Wattana 3–2 Guo Hua
 Ken Doherty 3–2 James Wattana
 Guo Hua 3–0 Hasimu Tuerxun
 Guo Hua 3–2 Ken Doherty
 James Wattana 3–1 Hasimu Tuerxun

Group 2

 Pang Weigo 3–2 Jimmy White
 Ronnie O'Sullivan 3–1 Xu Xinjian
 Jimmy White 3–1 Ronnie O'Sullivan
 Pang Weiguo 3–0 Xu Xinjian
 Jimmy White 3–1 Xu Xinjian
 Ronnie O'Sullivan 3–1 Pang Weiguo

 O'Sullivan progressed on a head-to-head basis by winning his match against Pang Weiguo

Knockout stage

References

1997 in Chinese sport
1997 in snooker